Diceratias trilobus is a species of double angler, a type of anglerfish. It is endemic to the northwest Pacific Ocean.

References

Diceratiidae
Deep sea fish
Fish described in 1986